Reduplication is a process by which the root or stem of a word, or part of it, is repeated. Alternative terms include cloning, doubling, duplication, and repetition. Reduplication has a grammatical function in some languages, such as plurality or intensification. It is also used to derive new words. The process of anthroponymy, or naming people, is frequently creative, and provides examples of this.

During immigration many Arabs or others who use the Arab naming structure do not have a family name but take their father's name as their "last name". Most immigrants from the Arab world usually take their paternal grandfather's name as their last name.

Reduplication in human names is sometimes used with hypocorisms, i.e., informal short versions of names. It is commonly used this way in French and Chinese, e.g., the French name Louise becomes Loulou as a diminutive. The nicknames and fictional characters below include other examples.

Surnames

 Carlos Hernan Andica Andica (born 1983), Colombian weightlifter
 Alexis Beka Beka (born 2001), French footballer
 Jacques-Roger Booh-Booh (born 1938), Cameroonian politician
 Ruben Boumtje-Boumtje (born 1978), Cameroonian basketball player
 Agustín Guillermo Carstens Carstens (born 1958), Mexican economist
 Cave-Browne-Cave baronets (since 1839)
 Eric Djemba-Djemba (born 1981), Cameroonian footballer
 Félix Eboa Eboa (born 1997), Cameroonian footballer
 Felipe González González (1947-2023), Mexican politician
 Pedro Gonzalez Gonzalez (1925-2006), American actor
 Alexandra Hall Hall (born 1964), British diplomat
 Lord Henry Howard-Molyneux-Howard (1766–1824)
 Juan Carlos I (Juan Carlos de Borbón y Borbón-Dos Sicilias) (born 1938), King Emeritus of Spain
 House of Kamehameha (19th century)
 Kazenga LuaLua (born 1990), English–Congolese footballer
 Lomana LuaLua (born 1980), Congolese footballer
 Roberto Mamani Mamani (born 1962), Bolivian artist
 Dieudonné M'bala M'bala (born 1966), French comedian
 Fuifui Moimoi (born 1979), Tongan rugby league player
 Charles Newdigate Newdegate (1816–1887), British politician
 Luis Rivera Rivera (born 1986), Puerto Rican gymnast
 Agnes Robertson Robertson (1882–1968), Australian senator
 Miguel Rodriguez Rodriguez (1931–2001), Catholic bishop
 Román Rodríguez Rodríguez (born 1956), Canarian politician
 John Scott-Scott (1934–2015), British engineer
 Ralph William Lyonel Tollemache-Tollemache (1826–1895), British clergyman
  Leone Sextus Denys Oswolf Fraudatifilius Tollemache-Tollemache de Orellana Plantagenet Tollemache-Tollemache (1884–1917), British captain
 Sofia Vergara Vergara (born 1972), Colombian-American actress
 Theodora Wilson Wilson (1865–1941), British teacher and author
 Ben Bag-Bag (c. 30 CE), rabbinic sage

Personal names

Reduplicated in the original language
 Ai Weiwei (艾未未, born 1957), Chinese artist
 May May Ali, daughter of American boxer Muhammad Ali
 Bo Guagua (薄瓜瓜, born 1987), former Chinese leader's son
 Fan Bingbing (范冰冰, born 1981), Chinese actress
 He Pingping (何平平, 1988–2010), Chinese record-holder
 Li Feifei (李飞飞, born 1976), American computer scientist
 Li Lili (黎莉莉, born Qian Zhenzhen, 1915–2005), Chinese actress
 Li Wenwen (李雯雯, born 2000), Chinese weightlifter
 Lily Li (李麗麗, born 1950), Hong Kong actress
 Liu Yangyang (刘扬扬, born 2000), member of China-based band WayV
 Yo-Yo Ma (马友友, born 1955), American cellist
 Sa Dingding (萨顶顶, born 1983), Chinese singer
 Moon Moon Sen (born 1954), Indian actress
 Chandos Scudamore Scudamore Stanhope (1823–1871), British naval officer
 Tan Weiwei (谭维维, born 1982), Chinese singer
 Tingting (婷婷) Chinese given name, multiple people

Not reduplicated in the original language
 Run Run Shaw (邵仁楞, 1907–2014), Hong Kong entertainment mogul
 Wang Zhizhi (王治郅, born 1977), Chinese basketball player
 He Ying Ying (何盈莹, born 1995), Singaporean actress

Nicknames or stage names

 Ada Adini (1855–1924), American soprano
 Bam Bam Bigelow (1961–2007), American professional wrestler
 BeBe & CeCe Winans (born 1962 and 1964), American singers
 Bebe Rexha (born 1989), American singer
 BeBe Zahara Benet (born 1981), Cameroonian drag queen
 Bianca Bianchi (1855–1947), German coloratura soprano
 Bibi (singer) (born 1998), South Korean singer-songwriter
 Billy Dee Williams (born 1937), African-American actor
 Boom Boom Geoffrion (1931–2006), Canadian ice hockey player and coach
 Booboo Stewart (born 1994), American actor
 CeCe Peniston (born 1969), African-American singer
 Chi Chi LaRue (born 1959), American film director
 Coco Chanel (1883–1971), French fashion designer
 Courtney Taylor-Taylor (born 1967), American lead singer of The Dandy Warhols
 Juan "Chi-Chi" Rodríguez (born 1935), Puerto Rican golfer
 De De Pierce, American jazz trumpeter and cornetist
 Doug E. Doug (born 1970), African-American actor
 Dudley Dudley (born 1973), ring name of American professional wrestler Jeff Bradley
 Fei Fei (1945–2008), Hong Kong actress
 Flavor Flav (born 1959), American rapper
 Franco Franchi (1928–1992), Italian comedian
 Gae Gae (born 1991), Burmese singer
 Pedro Gonzalez Gonzalez (1925–2006), Mexican-American actor
 Jeffrey Hammond-Hammond (born 1946), English musician
 Helle Helle (born 1965), Danish author
 Honey Boo Boo (born 2005), American child beauty pageant contestant
 Lord Haw-Haw (1906–1946), British Nazi propaganda broadcaster
 Jay-Jay Johanson (born 1969), Swedish singer-songwriter
 JoJo (born 1990), American singer
 JoJo Siwa (born 2003), American dancer, singer and actress
 JoJo Starbuck (born 1951), American figure skater
 John John Molina (born 1965), Puerto Rican boxer
 Jorge Ben Jor, Brazilian musician
 José José (born 1948), Mexican singer
 Justo Justo (1941–2012), Filipino columnist and playwright
 Keke Palmer (born 1993), American actress
 Keke Rosberg (born 1948), Finnish racing driver
 Keke Wyatt (born 1982), American singer
 Lil' Keke (born 1976), American rapper 
 Kelly Kelly (born 1987), American female professional wrestler for WWE
 Kyary Pamyu Pamyu (born 1993), Japanese singer
 Lisa Lisa (born 1966), American singer
 Marky Mark (born 1971), American rapper and actor 
 Miou-Miou (born 1950), French actress
 Mr. Mister, American band
 Mitch Mitchell (1946-2008), English drummer (with Jimi Hendrix)
 Miu Miu, childhood nickname of Italian fashion designer Miuccia Prada (born 1949), adopted as the name of her Miu Miu brand in 1992
 Noël-Noël (1897–1989), French actor
 Rod Roddy (1937–2003), American television announcer
 Rucka Rucka Ali (born 1987), American comedian-rapper
 Rye Rye (born 1990), American rapper
 Snoop Doggy Dogg (born 1971; later known as Snoop Dogg and Snoop Lion), American rapper
 Steve Stevens (born 1959), American guitarist (with Billy Idol)
 Sylvain Sylvain (born 1951), American guitarist
 Totò (1898–1967), Italian comedian
 Toto Cutugno (born 1943), Italian singer and songwriter
 Toto Wolff, Austrian CEO of Mercedes-AMG Petronas Motorsport
 Tuck Tucker (1961–2020), writer, artist, animator, songwriter, and director
 Vinnie Vincent (born 1952), guitarist, songwriter and former member of Kiss (band)
 Xi Xi (西西, born 1938), Chinese writer 
 Bian Jinyang (born 1993), Chinese author who writes under the pen name Yang Yang
 Zsa Zsa Gabor (1917–2016), Hungarian-born American actress

Same personal name and family name
Among families with patronymic surnames, partial reduplication often occurs with people (usually males) who have the same forename from which the surname or last name derives. Examples include Sven Svensson, Ioannis Ioannou and Isahak Isahakyan.

American 

 Abraham Abraham (1843–1911), businessman
 Ahmed Ahmed (born 1970), comedian
 Barbara Barbara, fashion designer
 Hugh Brown Brown (1883–1975), attorney and Mormon church leader
 Chris Christie (born 1962), politician, governor of New Jersey from 2010–2018
 Doug E. Doug (born 1970), actor and comedian 
 Dudley Dudley (born Dudley Webster, 1936), politician
 Ea Ea, formerly Craige Schensted, physicist 
 Emery Emery (born 1963), stand-up comedian, film editor & producer, and author
 Evans Evans (born 1936), actress 
 George W. George (1920–2007), film director 
 Gordon Gordon (1906–2002), writer
 Griffith J. Griffith (1850–1919), industrialist and philanthropist
 Hamilton Hamilton (1847–1928), painter and etcher
 Holling C. Holling (1900–1973), author and illustrator
 Ivan M. Ivan (born 1945), politician, member of the Alaska House of Representatives 1991–1993 and 1995–1999
 Jim James (born 1978) recording artist 
 Jeremiah S. Jeremiah (1935–2015), judge
 John John (disambiguation), several people
 Khaled Mohamed Khaled (born 1975), recording artist under stage name DJ Khaled
 Kris Kristofferson, singer, songwriter and actor
 Lauren Bush Lauren (born 1984), granddaughter of George H. W. Bush
 Leon M. Leon (1903–1998), Hollywood sound technician
 Dr. Monica L. Monica, an eye doctor who has run for Congress from Louisiana several times, first in 1992
 Morgan Morgan (1688–1766), pioneer settler
 Morris Morris (1844–1906), actor
 John Myers Myers (1906–1988), writer
 Nyambi Nyambi (born 1979), actor
 Phelps Phelps (1897–1981), politician
 Phillip Phillips (born 1990), musician
 Richard N. Richards (born 1946), astronaut
 James Roosevelt Roosevelt, known as "Rosey" (1854–1927), diplomat and half-brother of Franklin Delano Roosevelt
 Thomas Thomas, several people
 Tuika Tuika, politician from American Samoa
 Ward Wellington Ward (1875–1932), architect
 Warren S. Warren, professor of chemistry at Duke University
 William Williams, several people

Arab 

 Abdullah Abdullah (born 1960), Afghan politician
 Ahmed Ahmed (born 1970), Egyptian-born American actor and comedian
 Azzam Azzam (born 1963)
 Boutros Boutros-Ghali (1922–2016), Secretary-General of the United Nations
 Fares Fares (born 1973), Swedish-Lebanese actor
 Haidar Haidar, Syrian novelist
 Kahlil Gibran whose full name was Gibran Khalil Gibran 
 Mahmoud Mahmoud (born 1981), Egyptian footballer
 Sirhan Sirhan (born 1944), assassinated Robert F. Kennedy
 Sirhan Sirhan (militant) (died 2003)

Australian 

 Aliir Aliir (born 1994), footballer
 Austin Austin (1855–1925), politician
 Sir Benjamin Benjamin (1834–1905), politician
 Burnum Burnum (1936–1997), activist
 George Georges (1920-2002), politician
 Grace Grace (born 1958), politician
 Hussein Hussein (born 1975), boxer
 Leigh Leigh (1975–1989), murder victim
 W. Lister Lister (1859–1943), painter
 Miao Miao (born 1981), table tennis player
 Michael ("Mick") Michael (1922-2016), Lord Mayor of Perth
 Pauli Pauli (born 1994), rugby league player for the Salford Red Devils
 Stuart Stuart, record producer

Canadian 

 David David (fur trader, 1764–1824)
 Raymond Raymond (politician, 1905–1978)

Chinese 
(Note: some of these people's surnames are not the same as the given names in the original language)

 Cao Cao (曹操) (155–220 CE), warlord
 Dong Dong (董栋) (born 1989), trampoline gymnast
 Fang Fang (方方) (born 1955}, Writer
 Fang Fang (方芳), Chinese spy
 Lang Lang (pianist) (郎朗) (born 1982)
 Li Li (badminton player) (李理)
 Li Li (gymnast) (李莉)
 Li Lili (黎莉莉) (1915–2005), singer and actress
 Lily Li ((李麗麗)) (born 1950), actress
 Miao Miao (苗苗) (born 1981), Olympic table tennis player
 Yang Yang:
 Yang Yang (badminton) (楊陽) (born 1963)
 Yang Yang (baseball) (杨洋) (born 1986)
 Yang Yang (painter) (born 1953)
 Yang Yang (A) (楊揚) (born 1976), short track speed skater
 Yang Yang (S) (楊陽) (born 1977), short track speed skater
 Yang Yang (athlete) (born 1991), Chinese sprinter
 Yang Yang (swimmer) (born 1997), Chinese Paralympic swimmer
 Yang Yang (conductor) (born 1973), Chinese conductor with Hangzhou Philharmonic Orchestra
 Yang Yang (tenor) (1974/75 – 2019), Chinese tenor
 Yang Yang (actor) (born 1991), Chinese actor
 Yang Yang (director), Chinese director, see Golden Eagle Award for Best Television Series Director (China)
 Yang Yang (scientist) (born 1958), Taiwanese-born material scientist at University of California, Los Angeles

Italian 

 Dino Dini (born 1965), video game developer
 Galileo Galilei (1564–1642), astronomer
 Guccio Gucci (1881–1953), fashion designer
 Guido Guidi, comics artist
 Guido Guidi (born 1941), photographer
 Niccolò de' Niccoli (1364–1437), Renaissance humanist
 Salvino Salvini (1667–1751), poet
 Santorio Santorio (1561–1636), physician

Japanese

 Eiki Eiki (1971–), manga artist
 Saito Saito (1972–), poet

Russian
 Vladimir Vladimirovich Putin, Russian politician

Welsh 

 Evan Evans (disambiguation), several people
 Griffith Griffith (1823–1889), founder of Penryn, California, and proprietor of celebrated Penryn granite quarries
 Griffith Griffith (1883–1967) 
 James James (1833–1902)
 Llewelyn Lewellin (1798–1878) 
 Morgan Morgan-Owen (1877–1950), Welsh footballer
 Owain Owain (1929–1993), writer
 Owen Owen (1847–1910), founder of eponymous chain of department stores
 Owen Owen (school inspector) (1850–1920) 
 Pryce Pryce-Jones (1834–1920)
 Pryse Pryse (1774–1849)
 Rob Roberts (born 1979)
 Thomas Thomas (1877 – after 1920), Welsh international footballer
 Thomas Thomas (boxer) (1880–1911)
 Thomas Thomas (cleric) (1804–1877)
 His son Thomas Llewellyn Thomas (1840–1897)
 Thomas L. Thomas (Welsh American baritone, 1911–1983)

Other British 
Among the early modern gentry, one custom was for a son's given name to be his mother's maiden name, and another was for a man to change his surname to that of a relative to receive an inheritance; these customs sometimes intersected to give names such as Cresswell Cresswell (born Cresswell Easterby) and St George St George, 1st Baron Saint George (born St George Ussher). 

 Alan Alan, magician (1926–2014)
 Anthony Anthony, compiled the Anthony Roll, an inventory of Tudor ships (before 1530-)
 Baden Baden-Powell (1860–1937), aviator
 Edwin Abbott Abbott (1838–1926), author of Flatland
 Ford Madox Ford (1873–1939), author, born Ford Hermann Hueffer
 Francis Francis (writer) (1822–1886)
 Francis Francis (cricketer) (1852–1926)
 Freeman Freeman-Thomas, 1st Marquess of Willingdon (1866–1941)
 Hamilton Douglas-Hamilton (1853–1929), cricketer and clergyman
 Hayman Hayman-Joyce (1897–1958), general
 Harbord Harbord (1675–1742), landowner and politician
 Jerome K. Jerome (1859–1927), author
 Edward Loveden Loveden (died 1822)
 Martin Martin (1660–1718), writer
 Michael Michael (born 1957), police informant
 Mohamed Mohamed (born 1984)
 Monier Monier-Williams (1819–1899)
 Neville Neville (1949–2015), cricketer and football agent
 Norcliffe Norcliffe (1791–1862), General
 Nortei Nortey (born 1994), footballer
 Richard Rich, 1st Baron Rich (1496–1567), Lord Chancellor
 Sir St George Gore-St George, 5th Baronet (1722–1746)
 St Leger St Leger, 1st Viscount Doneraile (died 1787)
 Samuel Samuel (1855–1934), politician
 Sassoon David Sassoon (1832–1867), businessman
 Sir Sitwell Sitwell, 1st Bt. (1769–1811), politician
 Solomon J. Solomon (1860–1927), painter

Other 

 Aaron Aaronsohn (1876–1919), Jewish agronomist, and organizer of Nili spy ring
 Abba bar Abba (c. 200 CE), Babylonian Jewish sage and Amora
 Abdul Aziz Abdul Kareem (born 1952), Kuwaiti Olympic sprinter
 Alik Alik (born 1953), Vice President of the Federated States of Micronesia
 Bernard Bernard (1821–1895), French priest
 Bol Bol (born 1999), basketball player, son of Manute
 Daniel K Daniel (born 1986), Nigerian television and film actor
 David Mathayo David (born 1969), Tanzanian CCM politician
 Morgan Demiro-O-Domiro (born 1995), French trampolinist, known for placing sixth in the 2015 Trampoline World Championships
 Elia Elia (born 1996), Samoan rugby union player
 Fitriani Fitriani (born 1998), Indonesian badminton player
 Gregor MacGregor (born 1786) Scottish soldier, adventurer, and confidence trickster
 Ntibinyane Ntibinyane, co-founder and managing editor of the INK Centre for Investigative Journalism
 Henry Henry (1846–1908), Irish Roman Catholic bishop
 Horst P. Horst (1906–1999), German-American fashion photographer
 Ivan Ivan (born 2002), Czech ice hockey player
 Jeejeebhoy Piroshaw Bomanjee Jeejeebhoy (1891–1950), Indian military pilot who served in the Royal Flying Corps during World War I
  (1876–1967), Czech musician and composer
 Kalonymus ben Kalonymus (1286 – c. 1328), Jewish poet, philosopher and translator of the Sages of Provence
 Daniel Koum Koum (born 1985), Cameroon-born Australian weightlifter
 Magid Magid (born 1991), Mayor of Sheffield
 Majok Majok (born 1992), South Sudan-born basketball player
 Mandla Mandela (born 1974), tribal chief and grandson of Nelson Mandela
 Marcel Marcel (born 2003), Czech ice hockey player
 Milos Milos (1941–1966), Serbian actor
 Mogoeng Mogoeng (born 1961), South African judge
 Muarem Muarem (born 1988), Macedonian football player
 Omar Mohamed Omar (1970–2008), Somali basketball player and coach
 Pavel Pavel (born 1957), Czech engineer, experimental archaeologist and politician
 Roger Roger (1911–1995), French composer
 Salim Ahmed Salim (born 1942), Tanzanian diplomat, served as 7th Secretary General of the Organisation of African Unity
 Sinoti Sinoti (born 1985), Samoan rugby union player
 Sunaina Sunaina (born 1980), Indian weightlifter
 Thomas Thomas (1917–1998), Indian surgeon
 Thomas Thomas Riley (born 1949), American businessman and former U.S. Ambassador to Morocco
 Tuika Tuika, Samoan politician
 Yrjö Sakari Yrjö-Koskinen (1830–1903), Finnish senator
  (1854–1917), Finnish senator

Fictional characters

 Albert Albert, the protagonist in the novel Albert Angelo by B.S. Johnson
 Lt. Andy Anderson of Perry Mason, a police detective played by Wesley Lau.
 Bamm-Bamm, son of Barney Rubble
 Bob Roberts, the main character of the film of the same name
 Bobobo-bo Bo-bobo, the main character of the eponymous manga and anime series
 Boo-Boo Bear
 Captain Captain Bane, a character in the actual-play Dungeons and Dragons podcast The Adventure Zone, created by father Clint and brothers Justin, Travis, and Griffin McElroy.
 Carlton "Carl" Carlson, a supporting character on the animated television series The Simpsons.
 Sir Cedric Cedric, a detective who was impersonated on Super Friends.
 Cha-Cha DiGregorio from the musical and movie Grease
 Charles Charles, a character on Pushing Daisies
 Chi-Chi or Chi Chi, a character in Dragon Ball media
 Chi Chi, a character in the Scarface universe
 ChibiChibi, a character from Sailor Moon
 Chum Chum, one of the main characters of the TV series Fanboy & Chum Chum
 Count Von Count, a recurring character from the TV series Sesame Street
 Cyril Bassington-Bassington, a character in the Jeeves universe of P. G. Wodehouse.
 Durand Durand from the movie Barbarella, origin of the name of the band Duran Duran
 Dwayne Wayne, character played by Kadeem Hardison on the sitcom A Different World
 Germain Germain, character in the movie In the House
 Grant Grant, character portrayed by Michael Rooker in the movie  Slither
 Henry McHenry, character played by Adam Driver in the movie Annette (film)
 Humbert Humbert, character in Vladimir Nabokov's novel Lolita (1955) 
 Jack-Jack Parr from The Incredibles
 James James Morrison Morrison Weatherby George Dupree, character in the poem "Disobedience" by A. A. Milne
 Jameson Jameson, a friend of Robert Brown in the Just William series by Richmal Crompton
 Jar Jar Binks, Star Wars character
 Jay Jay the Jet Plane
 Jimmy James, a character in the TV show NewsRadio, portrayed by Stephen Root.
 Jean Valjean, main character of Victor Hugo's novel Les Misérables
 Joseph Joestar, character in Japanese animated series JoJo's Bizarre Adventure
 Jugemu Jugemu Gokō-no surikire Kaijarisuigyo-no Suigyōmatsu Unraimatsu Fūraimatsu Kuunerutokoro-ni Sumutokoro Yaburakōji-no burakōji Paipopaipo Paipo-no-shūringan Shūringan-no Gūrindai Gūrindai-no Ponpokopī-no Ponpokonā-no Chōkyūmei-no Chōsuke, popular Rakugo character.
 Karol Karol, main character in Three Colors: White played by Zbigniew Zamachowski
 Kuba Kubikula, one of two characters in Czechoslovak animated series for kids called .
 Lenford "Lenny" Leonard, a supporting character on the animated television series The Simpsons.
 Leonardo Leonardo, character in Clerks: The Animated Series played by Alec Baldwin
 Major Major Major Major, character in Joseph Heller's novel Catch-22 (1961)
 Mao Mao (full name Mao Mao Mao), protagonist of the animated television series Mao Mao: Heroes of Pure Heart
 Mario, the popular Nintendo video game character, whose assumed full name of "Mario Mario", which had been used at times for decades, was made canon in 2015
 Meyer Meyer, character in the 87th Precinct series of novels written by Ed McBain.
 Min Min, a playable character from the video game Arms
 Mikael Mikaelson, character in The Vampire Diaries and The Originals played by Sebastian Roché
 Montgomery Montgomery, character from Lemony Snicket's A Series of Unfortunate Events series.
 Morton "Suds" Morton, protagonist of the children's book Fourth Grade Rats, by Jerry Spinelli.
 Moses Moses, a character from The Artificial Kid by Bruce Sterling.
 Peter Peter, character from Smosh videos
 Pim Pimling, from the TV series Smiling Friends
Lelei La Lelena (or Rerei Ra Rerēna), one of the main characters in the light novel Gate: Jieitai Kano Chi nite, Kaku Tatakaeri
 Richard "Richie" Richard from the TV series Bottom
 Richie Rich
 Ricky Ricardo of I Love Lucy, whose full name was once revealed as "Ricardo Alberto Fernando Ricardo y de Acha"
 Rin Tin Tin (various movie dogs)
 Shayla Shayla from the anime El-Hazard
 Saki Saki, from the anime and manga series Girlfriend, Girlfriend
 Spamton G. Spamton, from the video game Deltarune
 Sue Sue Heck, from the TV series The Middle
 Swaysway, from the TV series Breadwinners
 Teruteru Hanamura from Danganronpa
 Tetsutetsu Tetsutetsu, student in class 1-B in My Hero Academia
 Tikki Tikki Tembo-no Sa Rembo-chari Bari Ruchi-pip Peri Pembo, character from a book of the same name
 Tintin (comics and cartoon character)
 Tweek Tweak, character in South Park
 Wallace Wallace, the protagonist in the novel No More Dead Dogs by Gordon Korman
 Gayle Waters-Waters, main character of the webseries Gayle, by Chris Fleming
 William Williams, an alias assumed by Kimball Kinnison in E. E. 'Doc' Smith's Lensman series
 Woody Woodpecker, cartoon character
 Wilson Wilson, Tim Allen's neighbor on the Home Improvement television show
 Xiao Xiao
 Xiu Xiu, the protagonist of the Chinese film Xiu Xiu: The Sent Down Girl; also the name of an experimental music group.
 Yon Yonson in the recursive song of that name
 Yoon Yoon-je, the protagonist of Reply 1997

See also 
 Bilingual tautological expressions
 List of tautological place names 
 List of tautonyms in scientific names of animal species

References 

Reduplicated
 People